The Irish Go Association (IGA) promotes  Go in Ireland, and is a member of both the International Go Federation and the European Go Federation. It organises club and tournament events as well as teaching sessions.

In 2001 the IGA and British Go Association ran the 45th European Go Congress in Dublin, which was attended by around 400 players.

The IGA was founded in 1989, by the merging of two Dublin clubs - Trinity College and Collegians Chess and Go Club. The Association is cross-border, having affiliated clubs in Northern and Southern Ireland. Its national championship has run every year since 1990.

Championship finalists

See also 

 List of Go organizations
 All-Ireland, other pan-Irish sports

References

External links 
 Official website
 Cobh Go Club
 University College Cork Weiqi Club
 Belfast Go Club

Go organizations